A referatory is the name given to a web application system (also known as a database-driven website). It provides information such as the name and description, reviews, and hyperlinks (metadata) to resources or learning objects in a repository.  The repository provides the actual resource files, while the referatory is a website pointing at the resources.  Generally the idea of a referatory is derived from the domain of education.

External links
 Multimedia Educational Resource for Learning and Online Teaching - Merlot
 K-18, Ontario Educational Resource Bank (login required)
  D-Space (higher education)
 KlasCement.net, Flemish user generated Portal for Education (register for free)
 Instructional Repositories and Referatories 

Web applications
Web archiving initiatives